Stéphane Bergeron  (born January 28, 1965 in Montreal, Quebec) is a Canadian politician. He currently serves as a Bloc Québécois member of the House of Commons of Canada since 2019, he had previously served in that aspect from 1993 to 2005, and a Parti Québécois member of the National Assembly of Quebec from 2005 to 2018.

Bergeron has a bachelor's degree in political science from the Université du Québec à Montréal and a master's degree in the same domain from the Université Laval. Bergeron has been a political adviser and a teaching assistant at Laval in the department of political science. Bergeron also served in the Canadian Forces as a naval Cadet Instructor Cadre officer from 1984 to 1993.

Bergeron was a member of the Bloc Québécois in the House of Commons, representing the riding of Verchères—Les Patriotes from 2000 to November 9, 2005, and Verchères from 1993 to 2000. Bergeron held many positions as a Member of Parliament including whip of the Bloc and critic of Parliamentary Affairs, Intergovernmental Affairs, Privy Council, Foreign Affairs, Industry, Science, Research, and Development, International Trade and Asia-Pacific.

He resigned his federal seat and won a provincial by-election on December 12, 2005, under the Parti Québécois (PQ) banner. He became the member for Verchères of the Quebec National Assembly succeeding former Quebec Premier Bernard Landry in that riding. He was reelected in the 2007 provincial election. He was named the PQ's critic in parks and environment but was later promoted to the portfolios of families and seniors.

Electoral record

Federal

Provincial

|}2014 results reference:

|}* Coalition Avenir Québec change is from the Action démocratique.
2012 results reference:

|-Chou. 

|-

|}

|-

|}

References

External links
 How'd They Vote?: Stéphane Bergeron's voting history and quotes
 Stéphane Bergeron's Official Website
 
 

1965 births
Bloc Québécois MPs
Living people
Members of the Executive Council of Quebec
Members of the House of Commons of Canada from Quebec
Parti Québécois MNAs
Politicians from Montreal
Université du Québec à Montréal alumni
Université Laval alumni
21st-century Canadian politicians
People from Varennes, Quebec